Yurii Kosmych Hlushko, known by the pseudonym Mova, was a Ukrainian public and political figure, one of the organizers of Ukrainian national cultural existence in Green Ukraine (Zelenyi Klyn).

Life 
Hlushko was born 4 April 1882 in the village of Nova Basan, Chernihiv Oblast.

Hlushko graduated from the Railway Institute in Kyiv in 1899. During 1901–1903, he worked as a steamship engineer for Dobroflot steamships serving the Odesa-Vladivostok route.

Between 1904–1907, he worked for the Chinese Eastern Railway in Manchuria. From 1907, he lived in Vladivostok, worked as a draftsman and technician. He became active in the amateur Ukrainian theater society organized by the local Ukrainian community and the Ukrainian student society.

Hlushko was mobilized during the First World War and served at the Caucasian front in 1916–1917. In the spring of 1918 he became the head of the Vladivostok Ukrainian society "Prosvita" (—"Enlightenment") and the Vladivostok Ukrainian Council. He became the chairman of 3rd Ukrainian Far Eastern Council in the summer of 1918. He organized the 4th Ukrainian Far Eastern Council, which proclaimed him head of the Ukrainian Far Eastern Secretariat.

He was arrested by Kolchak's White forces in 1919 for Ukrainian activism. In 1922 he was arrested by Bolshevik authorities. Accused of anti-Soviet activities and "designs to split Far East from Russia and give it to Japan", Hlushko was sentenced in Chita in 1924 to 5 years imprisonment. After serving the term, he worked as a technician in the Far East and Tajikistan.

Hlushko returned to Ukraine in 1930, and died in Kyiv on 28 October 1942.

Works 

 Підручник актьорові. — Владивосток, 1918.

Literature 

 Глушко Юрій // Енциклопедія українознавства. Словникова частина. — Т. 1. — С. 389. 
 Попок А. Глушко Юрій // Енциклопедія історії України. — Т. 2. — К., 2005. — С. 124—125. 
 Биховський Л. Ю. К. Глушко-Мова // Нові дні. — 1952. — Вересень. 
 Світ І. Суд над українцями в Читі в 1923—1924 рр. // Визвольний шлях. — 1963. — Книги 3—5. 
 Чорномаз В. Глушко-Мова Юрій // Енциклопедія сучасної України. — Т.5. — К., 2006. 
 Степанов Іван. Українець з Далекого Сходу // Дзеркало тижня. — 2002. — № 15 (390). 

Ukrainian politicians before 1991
1942 deaths
1882 births
People from Chernihiv Oblast
People from Chernigov Governorate
20th-century Ukrainian engineers
Ukrainian male stage actors
Ukrainian theatre directors
Russian military personnel of World War I
Ukrainian people of World War I
Ukrainian people in the Russian Empire
History of the Russian Far East
Theatre people from Kyiv